The Blaicher B-38 was a Polish, single seat sailplane completed in 1938. Notable for its use of long span Fowler flaps, its development was ended by the German invasion of Poland in September 1939.

Design and development

Following the WOS-37, his development of the Czerwiński CW 5 bis, Michal Blaicher turned to a new design incorporating Fowler flaps. Construction began in the ZASPL workshops but moved when ZASPL became LWL, controlled by PWS, delaying its completion. Its first flight was made either late in 1938 or in the spring of 1939 at Lwów-Skiłnów, flown by Zbigniew Źabski.  After some modifications it was ready for official testing in August 1939 but was destroyed in the German invasion the following month. 

The all-wood B-38 had a cantilever gull wing built around two spars and covered with stress-relieving plywood. The mass balanced ailerons were assisted by Flettner tab and, inboard of them, Fowler flaps filled the remaining 2/3 of the span.

The glider's fuselage was a ply-covered, semi-monocoque structure of oval cross-section.  Its single seat cockpit, which included blind flying instrumentation, was enclosed and had a long dorsal fairing behind it. At the rear the cantilever tailplane was mounted above the fuselage on the fin; like the ailerons the elevators were tab assisted. Fixed empennage surfaces were ply-covered and the control surfaces fabric-covered.

A detachable, two-wheeled trolley was used for take-off and a sprung skid for landings.

Specifications

See also

References

1930s Polish sailplanes
Aircraft first flown in 1938